White Rabbit Radio is a far-right and white nationalist online radio station hosted by Timothy Gallaher Murdock, known by the pseudonym Horus the Avenger. The program promotes White purity, the White genocide conspiracy theory, and racist terminology.

Former U.S. President Donald Trump's views on the South African farm attacks have received praise on the program.

References 

Audio podcasts
White genocide conspiracy theory